Kurt Leon Sutter (born May 5, 1960) is an American screenwriter, director, producer, and actor. He worked as a producer, writer, and director on The Shield, and appeared on the show as hitman Margos Dezerian. Sutter is also the creator of Sons of Anarchy and its spinoff Mayans M.C. on FX; he wrote, produced, and directed the series, as well as played incarcerated club member Otto Delaney. Sutter spent time with members of an outlaw motorcycle club in Northern California as research for Sons of Anarchy. Sutter's wife, actress Katey Sagal, played main character Gemma Teller.

Early life
Sutter was born in Rahway, New Jersey. His father worked at the General Motors plant in Linden, New Jersey and his mother was a secretary for the Roman Catholic Archdiocese of Newark. He has two older sisters. He grew up in the township of Clark, New Jersey and graduated from Roselle Catholic High School in 1982.

Sutter attended Livingston College for the journalism department of Rutgers University—which was located there—eventually graduating from Rutgers University with a BA in mass media with a minor in English in 1986. He moved to New York City and studied Meisner technique, did theater, and taught at the Gately/Poole Conservatory. Sutter then attended Northern Illinois University for three years, starting in 1997, to obtain his M.F.A. in performance and directing.

Career
Sutter was hired as a staff writer for the first season of FX crime drama The Shield in 2002. He made his television acting debut with the episode "Blowback", in which he appeared as Armenian mob hitman Margos Dezerian. He co-wrote the episodes "Dragonchasers" and "Two Days of Blood" with fellow staff writer Scott Rosenbaum, and was promoted to story editor for the second season in 2003. He wrote the episodes "Scar Tissue" and "Dead Soldiers" and in 2004, joined the production team in the junior role of co-producer for the third season. He continued to write episodes and scripted "Playing Tight" and "Mum" with series creator and executive producer Shawn Ryan, "Slipknot" solo, and "Fire in the Hole" with consulting producer Charles H. Eglee. He reprised his role as Dezerian in the season's final episodes "All In" and "On Tilt".

He was promoted to supervising producer for the fourth season in 2005. He wrote the episode "Grave" solo, co-wrote the story for the episode "Judas Priest" with Eglee and co-wrote the teleplay with Rosenbaum. He co-wrote the story for the season finale "Ain't That a Shame" with Ryan; Ryan co-wrote the teleplay for the episode with co-executive producer Glen Mazzara. Sutter became a co-executive producer for the fifth season in 2006. He wrote the episode "Extraction", co-wrote the episode "Trophy" with Renee Palya and Tony Soltis, and co-wrote the season's penultimate episode "Fire in the Hole" with Eglee.

He became an executive producer for the sixth season in 2007, directed a promotional mini-episode for the sixth season entitled "Wins and Losses," and wrote the sixth-season premiere "On the Jones". He co-wrote the episode "Exiled" with Rosenbaum, also now an executive producer.

Sutter returned as an executive producer and writer for the seventh and final season in 2008. He wrote the premiere "Coefficient of Drag" and co-wrote the episode "Parricide" with Gary Lennon. At the close of the season he was the series' second most prolific writer (after Ryan), having written or co-written 18 episodes in total.

Also in 2008, Sutter created and executive produced a new series for FX entitled Sons of Anarchy. The show centers on the titular motorcycle club in a fictitious town called Charming in California. He was the series head writer and showrunner. Along with the pilot episode he wrote the episodes "Seeds", "Fun Town", "Capybara", "The Sleep of Babies", and the season finale "The Revelator". He would go on to write 61 of the show's 92 episodes. Sutter appears in the show as incarcerated club member Otto Delaney, and he cast his wife Katey Sagal in the starring role as the club's matriarch Gemma Teller Morrow. Sutter also hired several crew members whom he had worked with on The Shield, including unit production manager and producer Kevin G. Cremin, post-production supervisor and producer Craig Yahata, and directors Guy Ferland, Stephen Kay, Gwyneth Horder-Payton, Paris Barclay, Terrence O'Hara, and Billy Gierhart. The first season also featured The Shield star Jay Karnes as a recurring special guest star playing ATF Agent Joshua Kohn. This is a trend that continued in later seasons with the majority of the main cast of The Shield appearing in later episodes in a variety of different roles.

Sutter remained showrunner and executive producer for the series' second season in 2009. He wrote the season premiere "Albification", co-wrote the episode "Eureka" with Brett Conrad, co-wrote the episode "Gilead" with co-producer Chris Collins, co-wrote the episode "Potlatch" with Misha Green, co-wrote the teleplay for the episode "Service" with co-executive producer Jack LoGiudice from a story by Brady Dahl and Cory Udica, co-wrote the episode "The Culling" with consulting producer Dave Erickson, and wrote and directed the season finale "Na Trioblóidí". The second season featured The Shield star Kenny Johnson as a special guest star playing a club member named Kozik.

Sutter returned as showrunner and executive producer for the third season in 2010. He wrote the season premiere "SO", co-wrote the episode "Oiled" with Erickson, now a co-executive producer, co-wrote the episode "Home" with Liz Sagal, series' star Katey Sagal's sister and his sister-in-law. He co-wrote the episode "Widening Gyre" with co-producer Regina Corrado and the episode "Lochan Mor" with Erickson and Liz Sagal. He wrote the story for the episode "Turas"; the teleplay was co-written by Collins (now a producer) and Dahl. He co-wrote the episode "Firinne" with Vaunn Wilmott and the episode "Bainne" with Corrado and Erickson. He wrote the story for the episode "June Wedding"; Collins wrote the teleplay. He reprised the role of Otto in the season finale, titled "NS", which he also directed and co-wrote with Erickson. Johnson returned as Kozik in the third season. He would go on to produce seven seasons of Sons. The show concluded airing in December 2014.

In 2010, DreamWorks picked up Sutter's film script, Southpaw, and Eminem was eyed for the lead role. The film was dropped by DreamWorks in 2011, and was later picked up by MGM and Columbia Pictures. Antoine Fuqua directed the film, and Jake Gyllenhaal replaced Eminem in the lead. Rachel McAdams, Rita Ora, 50 Cent, and Forest Whitaker also appeared in the film. Southpaw was released on July 24, 2015, by The Weinstein Company.

In 2014, it was announced Sutter had begun developing The Bastard Executioner, a new series for FX, The series was ordered to pilot on December 12, 2014. Katey Sagal, Lee Jones, and Stephen Moyer signed on to join the cast of the pilot. On May 22, 2015, the pilot was ordered to series with a 10-episode launch to premiere on September 15, 2015, on FX. The series was cancelled after one season. He went on to create the Sons of Anarchy spinoff Mayans M.C. In October 2019, Sutter was fired from FX after multiple complaints were lodged against him about his "abrasive" and "unprofessional" behavior. Sutter appeared in the 2021 science fiction film Chaos Walking, his first feature film acting role.

Projects in development
Sutter is currently developing a 6-issue comic book miniseries with Boom! Studios entitled Lucas Stand. The first issue was released on June 1, 2016. He also worked a comic book called Sisters of Sorrow, the book was launched at the 2016 San Diego Comic-Con.

In May 2021, it was announced that Sutter would direct a horror film entitled This Beast, for Netflix.

In November 2021, it was announced that Sutter would create a western series entitled The Abandons, for Netflix.

Influences
Sutter has stated he's had multiple influences in his writing style, including William Shakespeare, specifically his play Hamlet. He based the characters of Sons of Anarchy on Hamlet. Other cultural influences include Mad Magazine, Hanna-Barbera cartoons, and the television show Hill Street Blues, among others.

Personal life
Sutter moved to Los Angeles, California in 2000. Sutter married actress Katey Sagal in a private ceremony on October 2, 2004, at their home in Los Feliz, California.  Their first child, daughter Esme Louise, was born January 10, 2007. Esme was carried by a surrogate mother.

Sutter is an animal rights activist, and is vegan. Sutter is also a motorcycle enthusiast.

Filmography

Film

Television

Actor

Producer

Writer

Director

See also
Outlaw Empires

References

External links

Sutter Ink Blog

Interview with Kurt Sutter

Living people
American male screenwriters
American male television actors
American television directors
American television writers
People from Rahway, New Jersey
Roselle Catholic High School alumni
Male actors from New Jersey
Showrunners
American male television writers
1960 births
The Shield
Sons of Anarchy
Screenwriters from New Jersey
Northern Illinois University alumni
Rutgers University alumni
American people of Norwegian descent
People from Los Feliz, Los Angeles
Television producers from New Jersey